Leo I, also Levon I or Leon I, (unknown – Constantinople, February 14, 1140) was the fifth lord of Armenian Cilicia or “Lord of the Mountains” (1129/1130-1137).

He learned to exploit the open, yet restrained, hostilities between the Byzantine Empire and the Crusader principalities of Edessa and Antioch. Most of his successes benefited from Byzantium’s pre-occupation with the threats of Zengi (the atabeg of Mosul) from Aleppo and the lack of effective Frankish rule, especially in the Principality of Antioch.

He expanded his rule over the Cilician plains and even to the Mediterranean shores. In his time, relations between the Armenians and the Franks (the Crusaders), two former allies, were not always as courteous as before: a major cause of dissension between them was the ownership of the strongholds of the southern Amanus, and on the neighboring coasts of the Gulf of Alexandretta.

Leo was captured after being invited to a meeting by the Byzantine Emperor John II Comnenus, who had sworn a false promise of peace. Leo and two of his sons were taken captive and imprisoned in Constantinople where Leo died shortly after.

His early life
Leo was the younger son of Constantine I, lord of Armenian Cilicia. It is likely that his mother was the great-granddaughter of Bardas Phokas.

When Constantine I died, Leo’s brother Thoros I succeeded him; Leo may have ruled in the eastern part of “the Mountains” during the lifetime of his brother (although the basis of this proposition is not known). Sometime between 1100 and 1103, Count Baldwin II of Edessa gave his sister in marriage to Leo; but the name and origin of his wife are not known with certainty. It is also possible that his wife was Baldwin II’s sister-in-law, a daughter of the Armenian Gabriel of Melitene.

In 1111, Sultan Malik Shah of Iconium entered Armenian territories, and two of the commanders of Leo’s brother were killed in battle. Saddened by this loss, Leo was so enraged that he launched a savage attack against the Turks and drove them into retreat. In 1118, Leo assigned by his brother brought a contingent to help Prince Roger of Antioch at the siege of Azaz (today A'zāz in Syria).

His rule

Thoros I died in 1129 (or in 1130), and his son Constantine II died a few months later, in the course of a palace intrigue. Other authors (e.g., Jacob G. Ghazarian, Vahan M. Kurkjian) suggest that Thoros I died without a male heir and was directly succeeded by Leo.

Conflicts with the Franks
In February 1130, Bohemond II, Prince of Antioch, whose ambition was to restore his principality, thought that the moment had come to recover Anazarbus (a former Antiochene town which had fallen into the possession of Thoros I). He marched with a small force up the river Jihan towards his objective. Leo was alarmed and appealed for help to the Danishmend emir, Ghazi. As Bohemond II progressed carelessly up the river, meeting only light resistance from the Armenians, the Danishmend Turks fell on him and massacred the whole of his army. However, it was due to Byzantine intervention that the Turks did not follow up their victory; and Anazarbus remained in Armenian hands – Michael the Syrian says that John II Comnenus at once started an offensive against the Turks.

Soon after Bohemond II’ death, Leo protected in his rear by an alliance with the Danishmend emir, descended into the plain; after a brief unsuccessful siege of Seleucia, he seized the three cities of Mamistra, Tarsus and Adana in 1131. In 1133, Leo captured Sarventikar, on the slopes of the Amanus Mountains, from Baldwin of Marash. But the Armenian hold over Cilicia was weak: bandits found refuge there, and pirates hung about its coasts.

In 1136, the new prince of Antioch, Raymond I decided that his first action must be to recover Cilicia. With the approval of King Fulk of Jerusalem he marched with Baldwin of Marash against Leo. But Leo, with the help of Count Joscelin II of Edessa (who was his nephew), drove back the Antiochene army. Triumphant, Leo agreed to have a personal interview with Baldwin of Marash, who treacherously made him prisoner and sent him off to captivity in Antioch.

In Leo’s absence his three sons quarreled: the eldest, Constantine, was eventually captured and blinded by his brothers. Meanwhile, the Danishmend emir, Mohammed II ibn Ghazi, invaded Cilicia, destroyed the harvest. Shaken by these disasters, Leo bought his freedom by offering to give up the Cilician cities (Sarventikar, Mamistra and Adana) to Raymond I; in addition he paid 60,000 gold pieces and gave his son as a hostage; but on his return home he forgot his promise. A desultory war broke out again, till, early in 1137, Joscelin II patched up a truce between the combatants. An alliance was then formed against the Emperor John II Comnenus, who was then pressing his claims against Antioch as well as Cilicia.

The (re-)occupation of Cilicia by the Byzantines
In the spring of 1137, the imperial army, with the Emperor and his sons at its head, assembled at Attalia (today Antalya in Turkey) and advanced eastward into Cilicia. Leo moved up in an attempt to check its progress by taking the Byzantine frontier fortress of Seleucia, but was forced to retire. The Emperor swept on, past Mersin, Tarsus, Adana and Mamistra, which all yielded to him at once.

Leo relied on the great fortifications of Anazarbus to hold him up. Its garrison resisted for 37 days, but the siege engines of the Byzantines battered down its walls, and the city was forced to surrender. Leo retreated into the high Taurus Mountains, while the emperor led his forces southward into the plain of Antioch.

After the emperor had asserted his authority over the Principality of Antioch, he returned to Cilicia to finish off its conquest. The family castle of Vahka (today Feke in Turkey) held out for some weeks. Eventually John invited Leo to a meeting under a false promise of peace, where the prince was captured. Leo and two of his sons, Roupen and Thoros, were subsequently taken prisoner.

His last years in exile
Leo and his two sons were sent to prison in Constantinople. They were soon allowed to live in the court under surveillance and John acted more honorably towards Leo, with the two dining and going on hunting parties together. Leo's son Roupen was later murdered by Byzantine grandees that were envious of his strength.

Leo died in Constantinople.

Marriage and children
The name and the origin of his wife are not known with certainty. Orderic Vitalis states that Leo was "uncle to the wife of Bohemond II of Antioch".  On this basis, some authors have proposed that his wife was either an unnamed daughter of Count Hugh I of Rethel, or she may have been an unnamed daughter of Gabriel of Melitene.
(?) unnamed daughter, who was the wife of a “Frankish knight from Antioch”, and mother of the Regent Thomas
unnamed daughter, the wife of Vasil Dgha
(?) Constantine (? – Edessa, 1138/1144)
Thoros II of Cilicia (? – February 6, 1169)
Stephen (before 1110 – February 7, 1165)
Mleh I of Cilicia (before 1120 – Sis, May 15, 1175)
Roupen (after 1120 – Constantinople, 1141)

(Leo’s second marriage proposed by Rüdt-Collenberg is speculative.)

Footnotes

Sources 
Bucossi, Alessandra; Suarez, Alex Rodriguez: John II Komnenos, Emperor of Byzantium: In the Shadow of Father and Son; Routledge, 2016, Abingdon; 
Ghazarian, Jacob G: The Armenian Kingdom in Cilicia during the Crusades: The Integration of Cilician Armenians with the Latins (1080–1393); RoutledgeCurzon (Taylor & Francis Group), 2000, Abingdon;

External links
Smbat Sparapet's Chronicle
The Barony of Cilician Armenia (Kurkjian's History of Armenia, Ch. 27)

Year of birth unknown
1140 deaths
Prisoners and detainees of the Byzantine Empire
Monarchs of the Rubenid dynasty
1080 births